"One More Drink" is the second official single off Ludacris' album, Theater of the Mind. The song "co-stars" T-Pain. The song was released on iTunes on October 28, 2008. Ludacris performed the song live while he and T-Pain appeared as musical guests on Saturday Night Live. The song samples Shalamar's "Take That to the Bank".

Music video
The video was directed by Chris Robinson and was made available for digital download on iTunes Music Store October 28, 2008. The music video features comedian Katt Williams and Big Boi of Outkast, Playaz Circle, D. Woods formerly of Danity Kane, Vanessa Simmons, and Shareefa and Shawty. It premiered on BET's 106 & Park after T-Pain and Ludacris performed in promotion of T-Pain's third studio album, Thr33 Ringz.

Chart positions
In the U.S. "One More Drink" debuted at number 86 on the Billboard Hot 100. It has since the peaked at number 24, making it Ludacris's fourteenth top-thirty hit on the chart. It has peaked number 4 on the Hot Rap Tracks, number 15 on the Hot R&B/Hip-Hop Songs, and number 35 on the Pop 100.

Weekly charts

Year-end charts

References

External links

2008 singles
2008 songs
Ludacris songs
T-Pain songs
Songs about alcohol
Songs written by T-Pain
Songs written by Ludacris
Music videos directed by Chris Robinson (director)
Songs written by Jean-Claude Olivier
Songs written by Samuel Barnes (songwriter)
Song recordings produced by Trackmasters
Def Jam Recordings singles